(Train Is Cancelled) Named after the famous Sahyadri mountain range that forms part of the Western Ghats in Maharashtra, 11023 / 11024  Sahyadri Express was one of 3 daily dedicated express trains managed by Indian Railways, that ply between Mumbai and Kolhapur in India. The other two daily trains on the Mumbai and Kolhapur run are 11029/30 Koyna Express & 17411/12 Mahalaxmi Express.

It operated as train number 11023 from Mumbai CSMT to Kolhapur SCSMT and as train number 11024 in the reverse direction. Currently, Sahyadri Express is not in operation.

Coaches

The 11023/11024 Sahyadri Express presently has one AC 2 tier, one AC 3 tier, eight Sleeper class and five General unreserved coaches. As with most train services in India, coach composition may be amended at the discretion of Indian Railways depending on demand.

Service

The 11023 Sahyadri Express covers the distance of 518 kilometres in 12 hours 15 mins (42.29 km/hr) & 13 hours 05 mins as 11024 Sahyadri Express (39.59 km/hr).

As its average speed in both directions is below 55 km/hr as per Indian Railways rules, it does not have a Superfast surcharge.

Traction

A Kalyan-based dual traction WCAM-2 / WCAM-3 locos hauls the train from Mumbai CSMT until  after which a Pune-based WDM-3A / WDM-3D takes over until Kolhapur SCSMT.

Timetable

 11023 Sahyadri Express leaves Mumbai CSMT every day at 17:50 hrs IST and reaches Kolhapur SCSMT at 06:05 hrs IST the next day.
 11024 Sahyadri Express leaves Kolhapur SCSMT every day at 22:50 hrs IST and reaches Mumbai CSMT at 11:55 hrs IST the next day.

See also
 Poona Mail
 Koyna Express
 Mahalaxmi Express

References

External links
Sahyadri Express - 11023
Sahyadri Express - 11024

Named passenger trains of India
Rail transport in Maharashtra
Transport in Kolhapur
Transport in Mumbai
Express trains in India